Tommy Haas was the defending champion but did not compete that year.

Tim Henman won in the final 6–4, 6–7(6–8), 6–3 against Mark Philippoussis.

Seeds

  Tim Henman (champion)
  Pete Sampras (first round)
  Thomas Enqvist (quarterfinals)
  Hicham Arazi (semifinals)
  Sjeng Schalken (second round)
  Greg Rusedski (quarterfinals)
  Andreas Vinciguerra (first round)
  Ivan Ljubičić (quarterfinals)

Draw

Finals

Top half

Bottom half

External links
 2002 AAPT Championships Draw

Next Generation Adelaide International
2002 ATP Tour
2002 in Australian tennis